Arda or ARDA may refer to:

Arts and entertainment
 Arda (Middle-earth), fictional world in the works of J. R. R. Tolkien
 Arda (band), a Russian heavy metal band

People
 Arda (name)

Places
Arda (Maritsa), a river in Bulgaria and Greece
Arda (Italy), a river in Italy
Arda (Douro), a river in Portugal
Arda, Bulgaria, a village in southern Bulgaria
Arda, County Fermanagh, a townland in County Fermanagh, Northern Ireland
Arda, Indiana, a community in the United States
Arda Peak, in Antarctica

Biology
 Amphisbaena arda, Rodrigues, 2003, a worm lizard species in the genus Amphisbaena
 Perzelia arda, a moth species

Acronym
Advanced Research and Development Activity
Association of Religion Data Archives